John Philip Keene (16 November 1921  18 October 1991) was a British physicist known for his work in radiolysis. While working at Paterson Labs in Manchester, he created a pulse radiolysis apparatus that led to the discovery of the hydrated electron.

References

1921 births
1991 deaths
Place of birth missing
20th-century British physicists
Alumni of the University of Birmingham